Quảng Điền is a rural district of Thừa Thiên Huế province in the North Central Coast region of Vietnam. It is located in the province's north. As of 2003 the district had a population of 91,514. The district covers an area of 163 km². The district capital lies at Sịa.

Aside from the township of Sịa, it has seven communes located on the shores of the Bo river, these are Quảng An, Quảng Thành, Quảng Phước, Quảng Thọ and Quảng Vinh. The other communes are Quảng Thái, Quảng Lợi, Quảng Ngạn, Quảng Công and Quảng Phú. The Bo River runs southwest through the district.

References

Districts of Thừa Thiên Huế province